Josiah Grout Jr. (May 28, 1841July 19, 1925) was an American lawyer and politician in the US state of Vermont.

Born in the British Canadian Province of Lower Canada to Vermonter parents, he served in the American Civil War as a Union Army officer before entering the legal profession after the war. A Republican, he entered politics and was elected to both houses of the Vermont General Assembly, serving as Speaker of the Vermont House of Representatives. Grout was elected the 46th governor of Vermont and served from 1896 to 1898.

Early life
Grout was born in Compton in the British Canadian Province of Lower Canada. He was the son of Josiah and Sophronia (Ayer) Grout. His parents, native Vermonters, returned to that state when he was six. He received his early education in the public schools and at Orleans Liberal Institute at Glover, Vermont. He was a student at St. Johnsbury Academy when the Civil War broke out, and he left to enlist.

Civil War
Grout enlisted October 2, 1861, as a private in Company I, 1st Vermont Cavalry. He mustered in as 2nd Lieutenant, Company I, on October 21, 1861. He was promoted to first lieutenant on April 25, 1862, and captain on April 4, 1863. After participating in 17 battles, he was wounded on April 1, 1863, at the Skirmish at Miskel Farm against the Confederate partisan John S. Mosby, near Broad Run, Virginia, and was discharged due to his wounds on October 1, 1863. After the St. Albans Raid, he was commissioned captain, Company M, Vermont Frontier Cavalry (26th New York Cavalry), on January 10, 1865, and promoted to major of the regiment on March 22, 1865. He mustered out with the two Vermont companies on June 27, 1865.

Career in law and politics
After the war, he studied law in Barton with his brother, William W. Grout, a Civil War veteran and politician.

Josiah Grout was admitted to the bar in December 1865 and in 1866 moved to Island Pond, where he was in charge of the Customs House for three years. His appointment included the districts of Newport and St. Albans.

In October 1867, he married Harriet Hinman, daughter of Aaron and Nancy (Stewart) Hinman. In 1874, he moved to Chicago, and afterward to Moline, Illinois, where he was one of the supervisors of Rock Island County for two years. He returned to Vermont in 1880, where he took up farming, and raised some of the finest Jersey cattle, blooded Morgan horses and Shropshire sheep in Vermont.

A Republican, Grout represented Newport in the Vermont House of Representatives in 1872 and 1874, and Derby in 1884, 1886 and 1883. He was elected state Senator from Orleans County in 1892. In 1874, 1886 and 1888 he was Speaker of the Vermont House of Representatives. Grout was also head of the Republican Club of Derby, and was vice president of the Vermont League of Republican Clubs for four years, and president for one.

At the Republican State Convention on June 17, 1896, Grout was narrowly nominated as the party's candidate for governor, received 339 votes compared to William W. Stickney's 336. He easily beat Democrat J. Henry Jackson in the general election, receiving 53,426 votes (76.4%) to Jackson's 14,855 (21.2%).

Grout's term was highlighted by enhancement to the state's educational system, the establishment of the post of Vermont Attorney General, a visit to the Tennessee Centennial Exposition. The Spanish–American War broke out during Grout's term, and at the start of the war Grout tended the services of a regiment of infantry and a battery of six guns from the Vermont Militia, which was accepted by the federal government. On May 21, 1898, he dispatched a regiment of 47 officers and 980 men to the war. Due to the short duration of the war, however, the Vermont regiment saw no active service, and returned to the state on August 21, where it was reviewed by Grout at Camp Ethan Allen. In October 1898, Grout was succeeded by Edward Curtis Smith, son of one of Vermont's previous governors, J. Gregory Smith.

Grout again represented Derby in the General Assembly in 1904. Grout died in Derby, and is buried in the Derby Center cemetery.

His son Aaron H. Grout, served as Vermont Secretary of State from 1923 to 1927.

See also
Vermont in the Civil War

References
 Crockett, Walter Hill, Vermont The Green Mountain State, New York: The Century History Company, Inc., 1921, pp. iv:162, 177, 242, 244–245, 248, 250, 257–260, 268,-269, 293, 295–296, 299.
 Dodge, Prentiss C., compiler. Encyclopedia Vermont Biography 1912, Burlington, VT: Ullery Publishing Company, 1912, p. 49.
 Ullery, Jacob G., compiler, Men of Vermont: An Illustrated Biographical History of Vermonters and Sons of Vermont, Brattleboro, VT: Transcript Publishing Company, 1894, Part ii, pp. 165–166.
 Peck, Theodore S., compiler, ''Revised Roster of Vermont Volunteers and lists of Vermonters Who Served in the Army and Navy of the United States During the War of the Rebellion, 1861–66. Montpelier, VT.: Press of the Watchman Publishing Co., 1892, pp. 253, 656–657.

Notes

1842 births
1925 deaths
Republican Party governors of Vermont
People of Vermont in the American Civil War
Republican Party Vermont state senators
Speakers of the Vermont House of Representatives
Republican Party members of the Vermont House of Representatives
Vermont lawyers
People from Derby, Vermont
People from Newport (city), Vermont
Burials in Vermont
19th-century American lawyers